Norman A. Carlson (August 10, 1933 – August 9, 2020) was an American correctional officer and businessman. He was best known for his direction of the Federal Bureau of Prisons from 1970 to 1987 and long-time involvement with this bureau. During his involvement, he served in the United States Penitentiary of Leavenworth, Kansas, and also in the Federal Correctional Institution of Ashland, Kentucky. He was president of the American Correctional Association from 1978 to 1980 and was the adjunct professor for the Department of Sociology at the University of Minnesota for 11 years (1987–98). In 1978, he was awarded the Roger W. Jones Award for Executive Leadership for his leadership in the training of federal government managers and executives and in his organizational abilities.

He served as director emeritus of GEO Group, a private prison company based in Boca Raton, Florida.

Carlson died on August 9, 2020, at a hospital in Phoenix, Arizona from lymphoma, aged 86.

References

Sources
"Norman A. Carlson". The GEO Group, Inc., August 31, 2010.

1933 births
2020 deaths
People from Sioux City, Iowa
University of Minnesota faculty
Federal Bureau of Prisons officials